The inline speed skating events at the 2009 World Games in Kaohsiung was played between 17 and 19 July. Sixty roller skaters, from 18 nations, participated in the tournament. The competition took place at Yangming Skating Rink.

Participating nations

Medal table

Events

Men

Women

References

External links
 World Skate
 Roller sports on IWGA website
 Results
 Entries

 
2009 World Games
2009